This is a list of mining areas in Colombia. The mineral industry of Colombia is large and diverse; the country occupies the first place in mining areas per surface area in the world. In pre-Columbian  times, mining of gold, silver, copper, emeralds, salt, coal and other minerals was already widespread. Precious metals as gold, and silver, platinum, nickel and coltan are located in different areas throughout the country. Colombia is the first producer of emeralds and as per February 2017 occupied a ninth position in the production of coal, produced in almost all of the departments of the country. Platinum is mostly found in the Western and Central Ranges of the Colombian Andes. Copper said to have been produced during colonial and later times apparently came from small shoots which may have been worked primarily for their gold content. The largest gold mine in Colombia is scheduled to start operations in Buriticá, Antioquia.

Frequently, there are conflicts between the potential mining activities and the indigenous communities in the country, especially in the eastern, sparsely populated departments of Vichada, Guanía, Guaviare and Vaupés.



Maps

List

See also 

 List of fossiliferous stratigraphic units in Colombia
 Mineral industry of Colombia
 Colombian emeralds
 List of mines in South Africa

References

Bibliography

General

Gold

Nickel

Emeralds

Coal

Coltan

External links 

  Producción minera – Simco

 
 
Minerals
Colombia
Colombia
Mining